Head of Grassy is an unincorporated community in Lewis County, Kentucky, United States. Head of Grassy had a post office, which opened on November 19, 1878, and closed in 1982 or 1984.

References

Unincorporated communities in Lewis County, Kentucky
Unincorporated communities in Kentucky